The Sinclair's Mysteries is a quartet of children's historical mysteries from author Katherine Woodfine. The first book, The Mystery of the Clockwork Sparrow, was published in June 2015. It was a Waterstones Book of the Month. The sequel, The Mystery of the Jewelled Moth, was published in February 2016; the third instalment, The Mystery of the Painted Dragon, was published in February 2017, with the fourth and final instalment The Midnight Peacock published in October 2017.

Each of the novels is set in Edwardian London and revolves around the fictional department store, Sinclair's. Sinclair's is an establishment very much like Selfridge's, catering to London's rich, offering high fashion, perfumes and sweets. The series heroines Lilian Rose and Sophie Taylor are employed on the shop floor and frequently find themselves privy to criminal goings-on.

Novels

The Mystery of the Clockwork Sparrow 
Left penniless when her father dies, Sophie is pleased to find a job in the millinery department of Sinclair's, soon to be London's largest and most glamorous department store. There, she makes friends with Billy, a junior porter, and beautiful Lil, who is one of the department store “manikins” by day and an aspiring actress by night.

Just before the store is due to open, there is a daring burglary, including the theft of the priceless Clockwork Sparrow. When Sophie herself becomes a suspect, the only solution is to solve the mystery of the Clockwork Sparrow. Her friend's Lil and Billy help her to solve the crime.

The Mystery of the Jewelled Moth 
In The Mystery of the Jewelled Moth, Sophie and Lill are faced with yet another mystery. When debutant veronica Whitley loses her priceless brooch, it's up Sophie and Lill to save the day. Gasp at our two young heroines as they bravely that go under disguise, discover secret rooms and of course, reveal secret identities!

The Mystery of the Painted Dragon
In this novel, we see a young budding artist called Leonora Fitzgerald go to art school in London. Whilst in London, a priceless painting gets stolen after she is told by Randolf Lyle to recreate the stolen painting.
She meets fellow artists Connie who is involved with the suffragette movement, Jack Rose who is Lil's brother. Together they find out that the baron is behind this by going to a meeting where the Franteis Draconm the brotherhood of dragons meet where they find out that Lyle was the one who stole the dragon painting. Sophie and Lil with help from Leo, Jack, Joe, Connie, the suffragettes, Veronica Whiteley and Mei a young Chinese girl break into Lyle's apartment with Sophie and Lil actually in the house and the others acting as distractions. In the end, they arrest Lyle with the help of Private Detective McDermott and Chief inspector Worth.

The Midnight Peacock 
In The Midnight Peacock, Sophie and Lil find themselves trying to solve a festive mystery at a party in snowy Winter Hall. Back in London, Mr Sinclair's New Year's Eve Midnight Peacock Ball might just spell disaster for the  young detectives and their friends.

Characters 
Sophie Taylor – Sophie was left orphaned at a younger age. Unaware of her passion for solving mysteries, Sophie begins work at the lavish Sinclair, where she finds many new friends.

Lilian Rose – Sophie's best friend, Lilian, aspires to be an actress against her wealthy parents' wishes. She works as a model at Sinclair's. She is shrewd, confident and naturally inquisitive. In the Mystery of the Painted Dragon, it is found out that she has a brother Jonathan "Jack".

Billy – Billy is one of the junior porters at Sinclair's. He becomes good friends with Sophie, Lil, and joe. He is also aspiring to be like his heroine Montgomery Baxter. 

Mei Lim- in book two, the friends meet Mei, a young girl from China town. Mei  soon becomes a trustworthy friend of all four of the mystery solving gang. Mei's father is Chinese and her mother english. They own a small shop in China town which 
becomes a second home for Sophie and Lil.

Mr Cooper – The manager of Sinclair's. Outwardly stern but actually very generous. However he is discovered to be in league with the Baron.

Leonora Fitzgerald - The youngest daughter of Lady Lucy Fitzgerald. She is a promising art student at the art school the Spencers. At young age, Leo was afflicted with an illness such took away her ability to walk, however, Leo was determined to walk again. And so, with help of her crutch, she slowly regains the ability to walk .

Veronica Whiteley - The daughter of a wealthy mine owner. She's a debutante who was going to be engaged with Lord Beaucastle an aristocratic who is later revealed to be the baron.

John Hardcastle - In the midnight peacock revealed to be the Baron. He's the disgraced youngest son of the duke of Cleaveland.

Edward Sinclair - On the surface, a millionaire later to be revealed to be in fact a spy sent by America to investigate Fraternitas Draconum - the brotherhood of dragons.

Joe - After running away from the baron boys, Joe meets Sophie Lil and Billy who help him out of his tangled life, and give him a chance to have a fresh start.like sophie, Joe has no family, but he soon finds that Billy, Sophie and lil are the best family he could have. He develops feelings towards Lil as the series progresses .

Jack- Lil’s older brother  who is also stuffing at the Spencer, he is one of Leo's bestfriends .

References

Series of children's books
British children's novels
Children's historical novels
Children's mystery novels
British historical novels
British mystery novels
Historical mystery novels
Novels about orphans
Novels set in London
Egmont Books books